HLA may refer to:

Airports
 Hacienda Lipangue Airport, Chile
 Huslia Airport (FAA LID: HLA), in Alaska, United States
 Lanseria International Airport (IATA: HLA), near Johannesburg, South Africa

People
 Hla Myint (Brigadier General) (born 1940s), Burmese politician
 Hla Myint (1920–2017), Burmese economist
 Hla Pe (1913–2007), Burmese linguist
 Hla Thaung (died 1949), Burmese soldier
 M.T. Hla (U Tun Hla) (1874–1946), Burmese painter
 Min Saw Hla (1532–1564), king of Arakan
 Sanda Min Hla (died 1363), Chief queen consort of Hanthawaddy
 Saw Min Hla, Chief queen consort of Ava

Schools
 Heath Lane Academy, in Earl Shilton, Leicestershire, England
 Hidden Lake Academy, in Georgia, United States
 Hillcrest Lutheran Academy, in Minnesota, United States

Science and technology
 High Level Architecture, a distributed computer simulation standard
 High Level Assembly, an Intel 80x86 Assembly Language
 HLA (journal), a scientific journal
 HLA Informatics Group
 Human leukocyte antigen, a locus of genes
 Hydraulic Launch Assist, a proprietary regenerative braking system

Sports
 Handball League Australia, an Australian handball league
 Handball Liga Austria, the name of the professional handball league in Austria

Other
 HLA (radio station), a South Korean time signal station
 Half-Life: Alyx, a 2020 video game by Valve
 Halia language,  in Papua New Guinea
 Haryana Legislative Assembly, the unicameral state legislature of Haryana state in India
 Hawaii Library Association, professional organization for librarians in Hawaii
 Heilan Home, a Chinese clothing brand